The North Museum of Nature and Science is a museum in Lancaster, Pennsylvania, specialising in natural history, part of Franklin & Marshall College.

History 
The museum was founded in 1953 with help from local businessman Hugh M. North. It became independent from the college in 1992.

In 2014, the museum underwent a renovation before reopening in 2015.

Exhibits 
 Birds
 Fossils - Contains several dinosaur fossils and an authentic moa skeleton.
 Rocks and Minerals
 Live Animals

External links 
 Website

References 

Natural history museums in Pennsylvania
Museums in Pennsylvania
Museums in Lancaster County, Pennsylvania
Paleontology in Pennsylvania
Dinosaur museums in the United States